Newtonville School is a historic school building located at Newtonville in Albany County, New York.  It was built in 1925 and consists of a one-story, gable-roofed brick main block with a one-story, rectangular hipped roof wing.  It is in the Colonial Revival style and features a wood portico with two slender, fluted Doric order columns.  Atop the roof is an octagonal wood cupola with a copper roof.  The school was converted to administrative use in 1954.

It was listed on the National Register of Historic Places in 2000.

References

School buildings on the National Register of Historic Places in New York (state)
Colonial Revival architecture in New York (state)
School buildings completed in 1925
Schools in Albany County, New York
National Register of Historic Places in Albany County, New York
1925 establishments in New York (state)